Puy-de-Dôme (or lo Puèi Domat) is a department in the Auvergne-Rhône-Alpes region in the centre of France. In 2019, it had a population of 662,152. Its prefecture is Clermont-Ferrand and subprefectures are Ambert, Issoire, Riom and Thiers.

Named after the Puy de Dôme dormant volcano, its inhabitants were called Puydedomois in French until 2005. With effect from 2006, in response to a letter writing campaign, the name used for the inhabitants was changed by the Puy-de-Dôme General Council to Puydômois; this is the name that has since then been used in all official documents and publications.

History
Puy-de-Dôme is one of the original 83 departments created during the French Revolution on 4 March 1790. It was created from part of the former province of Auvergne. Originally, the department was to be called Mont-d'Or ("Golden Mountain"), but this was changed to Puy-de-Dôme following the intervention of Jean-François Gaultier de Biauzat, a local deputy, because of a concern that the name originally chosen risked attracting excessive unwelcome attention from the national taxation authorities.

Geography
Puy-de-Dôme is part of the current region of Auvergne-Rhône-Alpes and is bordered by the departments of Loire, Haute-Loire, Cantal, Corrèze, Allier, and Creuse. Parts of the department belong to the Parc naturel régional Livradois-Forez.

The department is in the Massif Central and boasts more than 80 volcanic craters. It is three hours from Paris and an hour from Lyon by highways A71 and A89. The A75 links it to the Mediterranean Sea.

Principal towns

The most populous commune is Clermont-Ferrand, the prefecture. As of 2019, there are 10 communes with more than 10,000 inhabitants:

Demographics 
Population development since 1801:

Economy
The departmental seat, Clermont-Ferrand, is home to one of the country's best known manufacturing businesses and brands, Michelin. Thiers is the oldest industry place in Auvergne with its cutlery tradition from the 14th century.

The countryside lends itself to tourism and Puy-de-Dôme is a weekend destination for city dwellers. As of 2019, 10.1% of the usable homes in the department were being kept as second homes.

Politics
The department was the electoral constituency of Valéry Giscard d'Estaing, who served as President of the Republic from 1974 to 1981. The president of the Departmental Council is Lionel Chauvin, elected in July 2021.

Current National Assembly Representatives

National Assembly Representatives to the 15th Legislature

Tourism

See also
Cantons of the Puy-de-Dôme department
Communes of the Puy-de-Dôme department
Arrondissements of the Puy-de-Dôme department
Maurice Persat

References

External links

 Prefecture website
 Departmental Council website

  

 
Massif Central
1790 establishments in France
Departments of Auvergne-Rhône-Alpes
States and territories established in 1790